Words Are Not Enough is the fifth studio album by Australian musician, Jon English. The album was released in Australia in August 1978. 
Three singles were released from the album, including "Words Are Not Enough", which peaked at number 6 on the Kent Music chart, becoming English's first top ten single.

Track listing
Vinyl/ Cassette (2907 046)
Side One
 "Give it a Try" (Bruce Brown, Russell Dunlop) - 2:56
 "Words Are Not Enough" (Garry Paige, Mark Punch) - 3:37 	
 "Free Ride" (Dan Hartman) - 2:43
 "Nights in Paradise" (T.Moeller, C.Gibley) - 5:09
 "Love is Alive" (G.Wright) - 3:57

Side Two	
 "Sail On" (Mark  Punch) - 4:19
 "A Love Like Yours" (Holland–Dozier–Holland) - 4:14
 "Fantastic (Ain't What it Used to Be)" - 3:52
 "Hot and Dirty in the City" - 3:22
 "Same Old Feeling Again" - 3:03

Weekly charts

References

External links

1978 albums
Jon English albums
Polydor Records albums